John Bruce Harris (8 December 1922 – 22 August 2014) was a leading Australian professional golfer in the 1946–69 period. As a club professional he taught thousands of golfers and as a player he won 90 professional tournaments on the Australian golf circuit. Harris also served 6 years in the Australian Army during the Second World War.

Harris won a record six Victorian PGA Championship titles from 1950 to 1963 and the Victorian PGA Championship trophy is named the "Jack Harris Cup" in his honour. He became a life member of PGA Australia (2001) in recognition of his distinguished services as a PGA member and his achievements in the golfing community. He also became an inaugural inductee into the Victorian Golf Hall of Fame (in 2011), alongside Peter Thomson, Burtta Cheney, Doug Bachli, Ivo Whitton and Bob Shearer.

Harris became a junior PGA member before age 18, under professional Colin Campbell at Long Island Golf Club in 1940.  His professional golfing career was then put on hold for the next six years when he was enlisted in the Australian Army during the Second World War. He spent this time serving as a sapper (a soldier of the engineer corps) in Darwin and later on Labuan Island in Borneo. Harris was discharged from the army in 1946, aged 24, to resume a golfing career after missing a critical development period.

Harris was reacquainted with Colin Campbell and Bob Spencer (Campbell's nephew) who were running a teaching school on top of the Manchester Unity Building in Melbourne CDB. Later they worked in Hartley's sports store on Flinders St.  All of Harris's teaching and practice at this time was done by hitting into nets off rubber mats. Harris won his first Victorian PGA in 1950 at age 28 while he was still teaching golf at Hartley's sports store.
  
In mid-1950 Harris became club professional at Keysborough Golf Club where he stayed for most of his tournament playing career. Bob Spencer later followed as Harris's assistant. Throughout his time at Keysborough he earned his living as a typical club pro (by teaching, running the pro shop etc.) and just like many of his contemporaries practice time to sharpen up his game for tournament play was very limited. Despite this, Harris, throughout the 1950s and early 1960s was still ranked in the top handful of Australian golfers along with the likes of Peter Thomson, Jim Ferrier, Kel Nagle, Ossie Pickworth, Norman Von Nida, Eric Cremin, Frank Phillips, Bruce Crampton, Bruce Devlin.

Even without overseas experience Harris recorded multiple tournaments wins against many golfers who were Australian Open winners including three of whom were also major winners. He also played in tournaments with many top overseas golfers who visited Australia such as Jack Nicklaus, Sam Snead, Art Wall Jr., Arnold Palmer, Gary Player, Bobby Locke, Ed Furgol, Ed Oliver, Max Faulkner, Dai Rees, Harry Weetman, Harold Henning, Peter Alliss, Jimmy Adams, and Sewsunker Sewgolum.

After his tournament playing days were over Harris also spent 13 years as the club and teaching professional at Sorrento Golf Club on the Mornington Peninsula. Harris also continued as a teaching professional at his own school in St Kilda.  He will also be remembered for his golf segment on the Channel 7 TV World of Sport programme in the 1960s alongside AFL legend Lou Richards, following on in this role from his first golf teacher, Colin Campbell. Even into his 80s Harris continued to organise a series of pro-am events for senior professionals. Harris was always willing to teach anyone who was interested in the game and was still assisting with lessons at the Wattle Park GC into his 90s.

Harris died aged 91 in August 2014.

Honours
 An inaugural inductee into the Victorian Golf Hall of Fame in 2011.
 Life Member of PGA Australia (October 2001). 
 The trophy for Victorian PGA winners was named the "Jack Harris Cup" to recognize his dominance in the event.
 Varley Trophy winner for best annual scoring average on several occasions.
 Australian International Squad member.

Professional wins (90)

PGA Tour of Australia wins (8)
1950 Victorian PGA Championship
1952 Adelaide Advertiser Tournament
1957 Victorian PGA Championship
1959 Victorian PGA Championship
1960 Victorian PGA Championship, Victorian Open
1961 Victorian PGA Championship
1963 Victorian PGA Championship

Other wins
this list may still be incomplete
1946 Victorian PGA Foursomes (with Colin Campbell)
1948 Yarra Yarra Open, Hartleys Easter Scratch
1949 Victoria Purse, Victorian PGA Foursomes (with Colin Campbell)
1950 Victorian PGA Foursomes (with Colin Campbell), Spalding Bowl, Woodend Purse, Amstel Purse 
1951 Penfold-Bromford Purse, Amstel Purse, Royal Canberra Fourball Purse
1952 Victorian Close Championship, Slazenger Purse, Penfold-Bromford Purse, Don Walker Cup, Chesterfield, Amstel Purse
1953 West Victorian Open, Woodlands Coronation, Victorian Open Provincial, Keysborough GC Purse
1954 Albert Park Purse, Peter Scott Purse, Woodlands Open, Yarra Yarra Open, Williamstown Purse, Amstel Purse, Kew Purse
1955 Arthur Findlay Cup, Latrobe GC Purse, Liquor industry Purse, Keysborough Purse
1956 Peter Scott Purse, Woodlands Open, South West Victorian Open, Liquor Industry Purse, Williamstown Purse, Latrobe Purse 
1957 Liquor Industry Purse, Woodend Open, Victorian PGA Foursomes (with Bob Spencer), Yarra Yarra Open, Chesterfield Purse 
1958 Liquor Industry Purse, Yarra Yarra Open, Woodlands Open, Keysborough Purse, Rossdale Testimonial, Northern Purse
1959 Mount Lofty, Amstel, Victorian PGA Foursomes (with Bob Spencer), Woodlands Open, Yarrawonga Open, Green Acres Purse, Cranbourne Purse
1960 Yarra Yarra Easter Open, Victorian PGA Foursomes (with Bob Spencer), Yarrawonga Open, Keysborough Purse, Kooringal Purse, Northern Purse, 3AW Purse, Kingswood Purse
1961 Henderson Purse, Victorian Close Championship, Woodlands Open, Liquor Industry Purse, Victoria Purse
1962 South West Victorian Open, Victorian Close Championship
1963 NSW/Vic Border Open, Victoria GC Pro-am
1964 Woodlands Open, Van Cooth Celebrities, Liquor Industry Purse, Royal Melbourne Purse
1965 Woodlands Open, Keysborough Purse

Team appearances
Vicars Shield (representing Victoria): 1948, 1951 (winners), 1952 (winners), 1953 (winners), 1954, 1955

References

Australian male golfers
Golfers from Melbourne
Australian Army personnel of World War II
Military personnel from Melbourne
People from Footscray, Victoria
1922 births
2014 deaths